Liang Jingyi is a Chinese para alpine skier who competed at the 2022 Winter Paralympics.

Career
Jingyi competed at the 2022 Winter Paralympics and won a gold medal in the Super-G and a silver medal in the slalom standing events.

References 

Living people
Place of birth missing (living people)
Chinese male alpine skiers
Alpine skiers at the 2022 Winter Paralympics
Medalists at the 2022 Winter Paralympics
Paralympic gold medalists for China
Paralympic silver medalists for China
Paralympic medalists in alpine skiing
Year of birth missing (living people)
21st-century Chinese people